William Post Mansion, also known as the Post Mansion Inn, is a historic home located at Buckhannon, Upshur County, West Virginia. It was originally built in the 1860s and extensively renovated in 1891 in the Neo-Classical Revival style.  It is a -story, brick dwelling with a three-story stone tower.  The front facade features a portico with Doric order columns.  A gymnasium was built over the porte cochere and a carport was added in the 1930s. Also on the property are a number of outbuildings related to a dairy, including a corn crib/granary, hay barn, one large equipment shed and two additional storage sheds  The property also has a guest house and a rustic gazebo.

It was listed on the National Register of Historic Places in 1993.

References

Houses on the National Register of Historic Places in West Virginia
Gothic Revival architecture in West Virginia
Neoclassical architecture in West Virginia
Houses completed in 1891
Houses in Upshur County, West Virginia
National Register of Historic Places in Upshur County, West Virginia